Makoekoe Mahanetsa (born 14 February 1963) is a Lesotho sprinter. He competed in the men's 4 × 400 metres relay at the 1996 Summer Olympics.

References

1963 births
Living people
Athletes (track and field) at the 1996 Summer Olympics
Lesotho male sprinters
Olympic athletes of Lesotho
Place of birth missing (living people)